The Technical University of Munich (TUM or TU Munich) is a public research university in Munich, Germany. It specializes in engineering, technology, medicine, and applied and natural sciences.

Established in 1868 by King Ludwig II of Bavaria, the university now has additional campuses in Garching, Freising, Heilbronn, Straubing, and Singapore, with the Garching campus being its largest. The university is organized into eight schools and departments, and is supported by numerous research centers. It is one of the largest universities in Germany, with 50,484 students and an annual budget of €1,770.3 million (including the university hospital).

A University of Excellence under the German Universities Excellence Initiative, TUM is considered the top university in Germany according to major rankings as of 2022 and is among the leading universities in the European Union. Its researchers and alumni include 18 Nobel laureates and 23 Leibniz Prize winners.

History

19th century 

In 1868, King Ludwig II of Bavaria founded the Polytechnische Schule München with Karl Maximilian von Bauernfeind as founding director. The new school had its premises at Arcisstraße, where it is still located today. At that time, around 350 students were supervised by 24 professors and 21 lecturers. The institution was divided into six departments: The "General Department" (mathematics, natural sciences, humanities, law and economics), the "Engineering Department" (civil engineering and surveying), the "Building Construction Department" (architecture), the "Mechanical-Technical Department" (mechanical engineering), the "Chemical-Technical Department" (chemistry), and the "Agricultural Department".

In 1877, the Polytechnische Schule München became the Technische Hochschule München (TH München), and in 1901 it was granted the right to award doctorates. With an average of 2,600 to 2,800 students, the TH München became for a time Germany's largest technical university, ahead of the TH Berlin. In 1970 the institution was renamed Technische Universität München.

20th century 

In 1906, Anna Boyksen became the first female student to enroll in electrical engineering, after the Bavarian government had allowed women to study at technical universities in the German Empire. 
Martha Schneider-Bürger became the first German female civil engineer to graduate from the university in 1927.

In 1913, Jonathan Zenneck became director of the newly created Physics Institute.

During the Weimar Republic, the TH München faced the challenge of limited resources and was drawn into radical political conflicts during the November Revolution, the Great Depression, and the rise of Adolf Hitler. Two of the 16 Nazis killed in Hitler's failed coup attempt in 1923 were students at the university. The National Socialist German Students' League became the strongest faction in the General Students' Committee in 1930, and Jewish and politically unpopular professors were terrorized by the young students.

After Hitler took power, the TH was soon aligned and a "Führer rector" was appointed, with the deans directly responsible to him. The Führerprinzip was also imposed on universities, resulting in a significant restriction of the autonomy of the TH München. In 1933, the newly enacted Law for the Restoration of the Professional Civil Service led to the dismissal of staff deemed "non-Aryan" or married to "non-Aryans," as well as politically "undesirable" professors. Jewish students lost their rights and were banned from enrolling after 1938.

The university was deeply involved in the crimes of the Nazi regime. For instance, Heinz Henseler, a professor in charge of animal breeding at the university, headed a new "Colonial Science Seminar" from 1940. The seminar focused on exploring how to "Germanize" the landscapes of Poland and Russia for future colonization and settlement during the war. The entire Faculty of Agriculture was influenced by the ideology of blood and soil, and agricultural scientists had no qualms about using forced laborers and prisoners of war on university experimental farms. Henseler repeatedly asked his former student and SS chief Heinrich Himmler for additional land and led several excursions to the SS herb garden on the grounds of the Dachau concentration camp with his students.

During World War II, the TH München conducted extensive research in armaments to support the war effort. Notable professors during this time included aircraft designer Willy Messerschmitt and physicist Walther Meissner. Despite the war, high-level basic research continued to be conducted in some institutes, as some professors, staff members, and students dared to disobey and resist. Nobel laureate Hans Fischer protected Jewish students from Nazi persecution. He committed suicide shortly before the end of the war.

Post World War II 

During the war, 80 percent of the university's facilities in Munich had been destroyed.  Under these difficult conditions, teaching resumed in April 1946.

In 1956, the construction of a research reactor in Garching was the beginning of the Garching campus. In 1969, the physics department building was opened there, followed in 1977 by new buildings for the chemistry, biology and geoscience departments.

In 1967, a Faculty of Medicine was founded with campuses in Haidhausen (Rechts der Isar Hospital) and Schwabing. By 1968, the TH München comprised six faculties, 8,400 students, and 5,700 staff. In 1972, the Zentrale Hochschulsportanlage, a 45-hectare sports center, was built on the grounds of the 1972 Summer Olympics.

In 1970, the TH München was renamed to its present name Technische Universität München. When the Bavarian Higher Education Act came into force in 1974, the six faculties were replaced by eleven departments. In 1992, the field of computer science was established as an independent Department of Informatics, having previously been part of the Department of Mathematics since 1967.

21st century 

In 2002, TUM Asia was founded in Singapore, in cooperation with the Nanyang Technological University and the National University of Singapore. It was the first time that a German university had established a subsidiary abroad.

The Department of Sport and Health Sciences and the School of Management were established in 2002. The Weihenstephan departments were combined into the "Weihenstephan Centre of Life and Food Sciences" (WZW), which would later become the School of Life Sciences. With the establishment of the School of Education in 2009, the School of Governance in 2016 and the Department of Aerospace and Geodesy in 2018, the university comprises 15 schools and departments.

Since the inception of the German Universities Excellence Initiative in 2006, TUM has won every round of evaluation and the title University of Excellence.

Campuses 
TUM's academic faculties are divided amongst numerous campuses.

Munich 

The historic Main Campus (Stammgelände) is located in Maxvorstadt, the central borough of Munich. Today, the departments of Architecture, Civil, Geo and Environmental Engineering, Electrical and Computer Engineering and the Schools of Management, Governance, Education are located here.

The TUM School of Medicine is located at the site of its university hospital, the Rechts der Isar Hospital, in the district of Haidhausen.

The TUM Department of Sport and Health Sciences is located in the Olympiapark, the former site of the 1972 Summer Olympics.

Garching 

The campus in Garching, located around 10 km north of Munich, has grown to become the largest TUM campus. In the last decades, the departments of Physics, Chemistry, Mechanical Engineering, Informatics and Mathematics have all relocated from their former buildings in the Main Campus. They have since been joined by numerous research institutes, including the Max Planck Institutes for Plasma Physics, Astrophysics, Extraterrestrial Physics and Quantum Optics, the Forschungsreaktor München II (FRM II), the headquarters of the European Southern Observatory (ESO), and the Leibniz Supercomputing Centre, one of the fastest supercomputers in Europe.

A landmark of the Garching campus is the Oskar von Miller Tower, a meteorological measurement tower with a height of 62 m. The Garching campus is connected to Munich by the Autobahn and the Munich U-Bahn. It has its own fire department.

Weihenstephan 
The third TUM campus is located 35 km north of Munich in Weihenstephan, Freising. It hosts the School of Life Sciences.

Other locations 
Additional TUM facilities are located in Ottobrunn (Department of Aerospace and Geodesy), Straubing, Heilbronn, and Singapore.

TUM Asia 

TUM operates a subsidiary in Singapore. In 2001, the German Institute of Science and Technology (GIST) – TUM Asia was founded in partnership with the National University of Singapore and the Nanyang Technological University, offering a range of Master's programs. In 2010, TUM Asia started offering bachelor's degrees in collaboration with the Singapore Institute of Technology.

In 2010, TUM and the Nanyang Technological University founded TUMCREATE, a research platform for the improvement of Singapore's public transportation.

Academics

Schools and departments 
As a technical university, the university specializes in engineering, technology, medicine, and the applied and natural sciences. Compared to a Volluniversität (a universal university), it lacks the Geisteswissenschaften, including law and many branches of the social sciences.

As of 2022, the Technical University of Munich is organized into eight schools and departments:

Other institutions include the Rechts der Isar Hospital, the TUM Graduate School and the Bavarian School of Public Policy.

The TUM School of Management is triple accredited by the European Quality Improvement System (EQUIS), the Association to Advance Collegiate Schools of Business (AACSB) and the Association of MBAs (AMBA).

Research 

The Technical University of Munich is one of the most research-focused universities in Europe. This claim is supported by relevant rankings, such as the funding ranking of the German Research Foundation and the research ranking of the Centre for Higher Education.

Under the German Universities Excellence Initiative, TUM has obtained funding for multiple research clusters, including e-conversion (energy technology), MCQST (quantum mechanics), ORIGINS (astrophysics, biophysics and particle physics), and SYNERGY (neurology).

In addition to the schools and departments, TUM has set up numerous research centers with external cooperation partners.

Integrative research centers (IRCs) combine research with teaching. They include the TUM Institute for Advanced Study (TUM-IAS), the Munich Center for Technology in Society (MCTS), the Munich Data Science Institute (MDSI), the Munich School of Engineering (MSE), the Munich School of BioEngineering (MSB), and the Munich School of Robotics and Machine Intelligence (MSRM).

Corporate research centers (CRCs) carry out research independently of the schools and departments, cooperating with industry partners for application-driven research. They include the research reactor FRM II, the Center for Functional Protein Assemblies (CPA), the Catalysis Research Center (CRC), the center for translational Cancer Research (TranslaTUM), the Walter Schottky Institute (WSI), the Hans Eisenmann-Zentrum for Agricultural Science, and the Institute for Food & Health (ZIEL).

Partnerships 
TUM has over 160 international partnerships, ranging from joint research activities to international study programs. Partners include:
 Europe: ETH Zurich, EPFL, ENSEA, École Centrale Paris, TU Eindhoven, Technical University of Denmark, Technical University of Vienna, NMBU
 United States: MIT, Stanford University, Northwestern University, University of Illinois, Cornell University, University of Texas at Austin, Georgia Tech
 Asia: National University of Singapore, Multimedia University, Hong Kong University of Science and Technology, Huazhong University of Science and Technology, Tsinghua University, University of Tokyo, Indian Institute of Technology Delhi, Amrita University, Sirindhorn International Institute of Technology,
 Australia: Australian National University, University of Melbourne, RMIT University.

Through the Erasmus+ program and its international student exchange program TUMexchange, TUM students are provided by opportunities to study abroad.

Rankings & Reputation

Overall rankings 
As of 2022, TUM is ranked first in Germany by the three most influential rankings. TUM was ranked 30th worldwide (1st in Germany) in Times Higher Education World University Rankings 2023, 49th worldwide (1st in Germany) in QS World University Ranking 2023, 56th worldwide (1st in Germany) in Academic Ranking of World Universities (ARWU) 2022.

TUM is ranked 7th overall in Reuters' 2019 European Most Innovative University ranking.

TUM graduates ranked 12th worldwide in the Times Higher Education's Global University Employability Ranking 2022, and 70th worldwide in the QS Graduate Employability Rankings 2018.

TUM ties for first place worldwide in the Times Higher Education's Impact Rankings 2022: industry, innovation, and infrastructure.

Subject rankings 
In the QS World Rankings, TUM is placed 19th worldwide in engineering and technology, 28th in the natural sciences, 29th in computer science, and 49th place overall. It is the highest ranked German university in those subject areas. 

In the Times Higher Education World University Rankings, TUM ranks 10th in computer science, 20th in engineering and technology, and 23rd in the physical sciences, being the highest ranked German university in those subject areas.

In the ARWU subject areas of computer science and engineering, electrical engineering, aerospace engineering, food science, biotechnology, and chemistry, TUM is ranked first in Germany.

Student life 
As of December 2022, 50,484 students are enrolled at TUM, of whom 36% are female and 41% are international students.

Student initiatives 
Various initiatives are run by students, including TEDxTUM, the TUM Speaker Series (past speakers having included Ban Ki-moon, Tony Blair, Bill Gates and Eric Schmidt), and IKOM, a career fair.

A notable student group is the Workgroup for Rocketry and Space Flight (WARR), which won all SpaceX Hyperloop pod competitions in 2017 through 2019.
In 2021, TUM Boring, won the tunnel-boring competition sponsored by The Boring Company in Las Vegas, Nevada. In 2023, a team from the university won second place at the Indy Autonomous Challenge, a autonomous racecar competition in Las Vegas.

Student government 
The Student Council is the main body for university-wide student representation. It elects the General Student Committee (AStA), which represents the professional, economic and social interests of the students, by the Bavarian Higher Education Act. Each school or department will also have a separate Departmental Student Council.

Every year, university elections are held to elect student representatives in the Senate (the university's highest academic authority) and in the faculty councils.

Events 
The Student Council organizes a number of annual festivals. TUNIX and GARNIX are week-long open air festivals held every summer. TUNIX is held at the Königsplatz near the Munich campus, while GARNIX is held at the Garching campus. GLÜHNIX is a christmas market held in front of the Department of Mechanical Engineering every December. MaiTUM is a Bavarian Maifest, held at the Main Campus in May each year.

The Student Council also organizes numerous events, including the student-run TU Film cinema, the Hörsaal Slam, the Benefizkabarett, and the MeUP party. Departmental Student Councils also organize their own events, such as Unity, esp, and the Brückenfest.

Campus life 
The Zentrale Hochschulsportanlage (ZHS) is the largest university sports facility in Germany, offering hundreds of different sports programs.

Music ensembles at TUM include the TUM Chamber Orchestra, the TUM Jazz Band, the TUM Choir, and the Symphonisches Ensemble München, a full-size symphony orchestra.

Notable people

Nobel Prize laureates 
17 Nobel Prize winners have studied, taught or researched at the TUM:
 1927 – Heinrich Otto Wieland, Chemistry (bile acids)
 1929 – Thomas Mann, Literature (Buddenbrooks)
 1930 – Hans Fischer, Chemistry  (constitution and synthesis of haemin and chlorophyll)
 1961 – Rudolf L. Mößbauer, Physics (Mößbauer effect)
 1964 – Konrad Emil Bloch, Physiology or Medicine (mechanism and regulation of the cholesterol and fatty acid metabolism)
 1973 – Ernst Otto Fischer, Chemistry (sandwich complexes)
 1985 – Klaus von Klitzing, Physics (quantum Hall effect)
 1986 – Ernst Ruska, Physics (electron microscope)
 1988 – Johann Deisenhofer and Robert Huber, Chemistry (crystal structure of an integral membrane protein)
 1989 – Wolfgang Paul, Physics (ion trap)
 1991 – Erwin Neher, Physiology or Medicine (function of single ion channels in cells)
 2001 – Wolfgang Ketterle, Physics (Bose-Einstein condensation in dilute gases of alkali atoms)
 2007 – Gerhard Ertl, Chemistry (chemical processes on solid surfaces)
 2016 – Bernard L. Feringa (TUM-IAS fellow), Chemistry (molecular machine)
 2017 – Joachim Frank, Chemistry (cryo-electron microscopy)
 2022 – Anton Zeilinger, Physics (Quantum information science)

Scientists 
 Friedrich L. Bauer, computer scientist, known for the stack data structure
 Rudolf Bayer, computer scientist, known for the B-tree and Red–black tree
 Rudolf Diesel, engineer, inventor of the Diesel engine
 Claude Dornier, airplane designer
 Emil Erlenmeyer, chemist, known for the Erlenmeyer flask
 Asta Hampe, engineer, statistician and economist
 Carl von Linde, engineer, discoverer of the refrigeration cycle
 Heinz Maier-Leibnitz, physicist
 Walther Meissner, physicist, known for the Meissner effect
 Willy Messerschmitt, aircraft designer, known for the Messerschmitt fighters
 Oskar von Miller, engineer, founder of the Deutsches Museum
 Erich Rieger, astrophysicist, discoverer of the Rieger periodicities that permeate the Solar System

See also 
 Education in Germany
 List of universities in Germany
 List of forestry universities and colleges

Notes and references

Bibliography

External links 

 

 
Engineering universities and colleges in Germany
1868 establishments in Germany
Educational institutions established in 1868
Universities and colleges in Munich